The teams competing in Group 5 of the 2013 UEFA European Under-21 Championship qualifying competition were Croatia, Estonia, Georgia, Spain, and Switzerland.

Standings

Results and fixtures

Goalscorers
7 goals
 Rodrigo

5 goals

 Isco
 Steven Zuber

3 goals

 Ante Vukušić
 Sergio Canales
 Álvaro Vázquez
 Haris Seferovic

2 goals

 Marc Bartra
 Pablo Sarabia

1 goal

 Arijan Ademi
 Duje Čop
 Dejan Glavica
 Andrej Kramarić
 Nika Dzalamidze
 Levan Kenia
 Nika Kvekveskiri
 Tornike Okriashvili
 Lasha Parunashvili
 Davit Skhirtladze
 Tornike Tarkhnishvili
 Mikk Reintam
 Albert Taar
 Thiago
 Gerard Deulofeu
 Koke
 Iker Muniain
 Martín Montoya
 François Affolter
 Nassim Ben Khalifa
 Josip Drmić
 Pajtim Kasami
 Raphael Koch
 Fabian Schär
 Nzuzi Toko

1 own goal
 Iñigo Martínez (playing against Georgia)

References

External links
Standings and fixtures at UEFA.com

Group 5